Antenina (also Sahavalanina-Antenina) is a town and commune in Madagascar. It belongs to the district of Soanierana Ivongo, which is a part of Analanjirofo Region. The population of the commune was estimated to be approximately 13,000 in 2001 commune census.

Only primary schooling is available. The majority 97% of the population of the commune are farmers.  The most important crops are rice and cloves; also coffee is an important agricultural product. Services provide employment for 3% of the population.

References and notes 

Populated places in Analanjirofo